Nigerian Idol is the local version of the Idol series franchise. It is the second Idol franchise for the country as it was already part of Idols West Africa which was also shot and produced in Stockholm, Sweden.

The show started with its first season in 2010, the 50th anniversary of the country with the tagline Live Your Dream. Accept No Limitation.

Auditions were open for every Nigerian between 18 and 28. The first season went on air in October 2010 and is shown on 15 different channels all across Africa.

On March 27, 2011, 26-year-old Onyekachi Elizabeth Gilbert Onwuka aka "yeka onka" from Ohafia was announced the first Nigerian Idol ever over fellow competitor Naomi Ebiama. Onyekachi was awarded the sum of 7.5 Million Naira, a recording contract with Sony, a car and an all-expense-paid trip to South Africa. Prior of receiving a Golden Ticket in Lagos Yeka unsuccessfully auditioned on two other occasions for the show. For the creation of the winning song the two finalists collaborated with award-winning producer Jesse Jagz. Yeka has since performed in different world know stages and started the first female band known as the "Gfactor band" in Nigeria.

There have been five following Nigerian Idol winners to date: Mercy Chinwo, Moses Obi Adigwe, Evelle, K-Peace and Kingdom Kroseide.

Judges and hosts

Judges
For season one, Yinka Davies, Audu Maikori and Jeffrey Daniel were selected to be the judges. In season two, Maikori was replaced with Charly Boy as a judge. In season three, Femi Kuti replaced Charly. In season four, Darey, Nneka, and Dede Mabiaku were selected as judges. In season five, Yinka Davies replaced Nneka. In season six, Obi Asika, Seyi Shay and DJ Sose were selected to be the judges with IK Osakioduwa serving as host. In season 7, Simi, D’banj, Yinka Davies and Obi Asoka were selected to be judges.

Season 1
The show was hosted by Misi and Anis Holloway and the panel of judges consists of producer and record label owner Audu Maikori, former Shalamar singer/dancer Jeffrey Daniel, and singer Yinka Davies.

Elimination chart

Season 2 

In 2012, singer Charly Boy replaced Audu Maikori who left the show to concentrate on other projects. The hosts are Tiwa Savage and IllRymz. The contestants were Chinedu, Najita, Nikki, Lynda, Ibinabo, Honey, Diwari, A.Y.O, Mercy, Steven Onochie, Anthony Ekpo and Sly 1 (Sylvester Kingston). Mercy Chinwo was the eventual winner.

Season 6

After a five year hiatus, Nigerian Idol was picked up by Multichoice and sponsored by Tecno Mobile and Bigi Drinks and began airing in 2021. Obi Asika, Seyi Shay and DJ Sose were selected as judges for the season. The show was hosted by veteran host IK Osakioduwa.

Through a series of auditions, a controversial top 11 was picked by the judges. This deviated from the usual top 10 format that was meant to be used in the selection. This act stirred up a lot of conversation on Nigerian social media space.

The Top 11 included Kingdom Kroseide, Clinton, Atela Francis, Akunna, Comfort Alalade, Beyoncé Ajomiwe, Daniel Ikechi, Faith Mac, Faith Jason, Dotun Deloye and Eljay. The contestants finished in the following positions. 1st.Kingdom, 2nd.Francis, 3rd.Akunna, 4th.Comfort, 5th.Faith Jason, 6th.Emmanuel, 7th.Beyonce, 8th.Daniel, 9th.Clinton, 1O&11.Faith Mac & Dotun. Because of the COVID-19 pandemic, the live shows didn’t have human audiences and used applause tracks instead.

For the top 5, top 4 and top 3 live shows, guest judges were brought in to evaluate the contestants. The guest judges included Mr P, Praiz and Cobhams Asuquo respectively.

In July 2021, Kingdom Kroseide emerged winner in what is said to be the most emotional Nigerian Idol finale ever. Kroseide was declared winner over his fellow Top 2 contestant, Atela Francis.

Kroseide was given a prize money of 30 million Naira, A brand new SUV, All expense paid trips to Dubai and Seychelles, a recording contract, a one year supply of Bigi Drinks and much more.

Awards and nominations

References

External links
 Official Site

Nigeria
Television series by Fremantle (company)
2010 Nigerian television series debuts
Music competitions in Nigeria
Non-British television series based on British television series
2010s Nigerian television series
Africa Magic original programming